Honor of the West is a 1939 American Western film written and directed by George Waggner. The film stars Bob Baker, Marge Champion, Carleton Young, Forrest Taylor, Glenn Strange and Reed Howes. The film was released on January 13, 1939, by Universal Pictures.

Plot

Cast        
Bob Baker as Bob Barrett
Marge Champion as Diane Allen 
Carleton Young as Russ Whitley
Forrest Taylor as Lem Walker
Glenn Strange as Bat Morrison
Reed Howes as Tom Morrison
Frank Ellis as Butch Grimes
Jack Kirk as Heck Claiborne
Murdock MacQuarrie as Hank 
Walter Wills as Rancher
Arthur Thalasso as Rodeo Announcer

References

External links
 

1939 films
American Western (genre) films
1939 Western (genre) films
Universal Pictures films
Films directed by George Waggner
American black-and-white films
1930s English-language films
1930s American films